Basse-Kotto is one of the 16 and the least populated prefecture of the Central African Republic.  Its capital is Mobaye.

References

 
Prefectures of the Central African Republic